The Great Lakes Avengers (also known as The Lightning Rods, The Great Lakes X-Men, The Great Lakes Champions, and The Great Lakes Initiative) are a fictional superhero team appearing in American comic books published by Marvel Comics. The characters were introduced in West Coast Avengers #46 (July 1989), and were created by John Byrne.

Publication history
The team first appeared in West Coast Avengers vol. 2 #46 and then made appearances in issues #48–49 and #64, and a cameo appearance in Avengers West Coast Annual #6. The GLA also make an appearance in issue #309 of Avengers and in the 1990 Avengers Annual. This was followed by appearances in issues #15–17 and #25 of Thunderbolts and issues #10–11 and #61 of Deadpool.

In 2005, the GLA were featured in a self-titled, four-issue mini-series (written by Dan Slott) and the one-shot, GLX-Mas Special. This was followed in 2006 by a minor appearance in I ♥ Marvel: Masked Intentions, The Thing vol. 2, #8, and Cable and Deadpool #30. In 2007, the team was featured in the one-shot Deadpool/GLI Summer Fun Spectacular. The team also made cameo appearances in issues #19 and #25 of Avengers: The Initiative and a minor appearance in issue #3 of Age of Heroes. In 2011, the team made an appearance in issue #6 of Fear Itself: The Home Front.

A new volume and ongoing series of the team debuted in 2016 from writer Zac Gorman (Rick & Morty) and artist Will Robson (Star-Lord). Seven issues were published for this series before ending.  Since then, the team and its associated cast have had only minor appearances and cameos in other Marvel comics.

Team name
The team has changed its name on several occasions. The Avenger Hawkeye first protests their use of the name "Avengers", and eventually the GLA are sent a cease-and-desist order by the Maria Stark Foundation. The team rename themselves the Lightning Rods after fellow super-team, the Thunderbolts. While working for S.H.I.E.L.D., Mr. Immortal suggests a name-change to S.W.O.R.D., although ultimately the team's name is changed to the Great Lakes X-Men when its members collectively realize that they are all mutants.

After another cease and desist — this time from Marvel Girl of the X-Men — the GLA rename themselves the Great Lakes Champions. Following the events of Avengers: Civil War, the team operated as the Great Lakes Initiative in the state of Wisconsin. Some time later, the team reverts to the name Great Lakes Avengers.

Fictional team biography

GLA: Misassembled
Craig Hollis discovers that he is immortal after being shot by a group of thieves and left for dead, and he decides to fight crime as Mr. Immortal. He realizes that operating alone may not be feasible. He places an advertisement for costumed adventurers in the local paper and assembles the Great Lakes Avengers, recruiting Dinah Soar, Big Bertha, Flatman and Doorman. Mr. Immortal refuses one candidate, Gene Lorrene, a leather fetishist calling himself Leather Boy. Turned down because he has no superpowers and is therefore ineligible, Lorrene takes the rejection personally.

The team is first seen in public by Avengers Hawkeye and Mockingbird, who watch the group as they foil a robbery attempt. Although annoyed by the team's naiveté and their use of the Avengers name without permission, Hawkeye and Mockingbird agree to act as the team's mentors. The Great Lakes Avengers assist the Avengers and West Coast Avengers from time to time, and once help them fight Terminus. After aiding the Thunderbolts against the villain Graviton, the GLA clash with the mercenary Deadpool.

After a period of inactivity, the team learns that the West Coast Avengers have been disbanded and that Hawkeye has been killed. The team subsequently battle Maelstrom, who is building a doomsday device. During this encounter, Dinah Soar is killed. New members Squirrel Girl (who has a pet squirrel Monkey Joe) and Grasshopper are then recruited. Although Maelstrom is defeated via Mr. Immortal's trickery, Doorman, Grasshopper and Monkey Joe are all killed (the last of these murdered by Gene Lorrene, who sought revenge against the GLA). Mr. Immortal is also killed several times, though he always recovers. Doorman is revived soon after his death and learns that he is connected to the Darkforce Dimension, and Mr. Immortal learns that as an immortal he is considered Homo sapiens supreme. Despite defeating Maelstrom and saving the universe, the Great Lakes Avengers' victory goes unnoticed. After receiving a subpoena from the Avengers and discovering that they are all mutants, the team decides to rename themselves the Great Lakes X-Men.

Crossovers
Squirrel Girl acquires a new partner, a female squirrel called Tippy-Toe; Grasshopper II dies after misjudging his armor's jumping capabilities and Doorman becomes an "angel of death" charged with conveying the souls of the dead to the afterlife. After Flatman wins a superhero poker tournament and Marvel Girl demands that they drop the "X-Men" name, the team assumes the name Great Lakes Champions.

With the beginning of the Civil War storyline, the GLC decide to comply with the Superhuman Registration Act, in fact waiting in line to register the day the Act is announced. The team is renamed as the Great Lakes Initiative, becoming officially sanctioned by the Fifty State Initiative as the team for the state of Wisconsin.

The team and Deadpool stop A.I.M. from using an "inebriation ray" that induces drunkenness in superheroes. Deadpool is granted reserve membership on the team, but is forcibly evicted from GLI headquarters after proving to be too much of an annoyance.

The team also appears during the Secret Invasion storyline confronting a Skrull disguised as Grasshopper, with help from Gravity and Catwalk. When Norman Osborn assumes control of the Initiative, he transfers Gravity to a leadership role in the GLI, much to the superhero's dismay.

After a fight with Fin Fang Foom, Squirrel Girl elects to leave the team and return to New York, because she feels that the other team members (who simply stayed in their headquarters, playing cards, during the fight) have come to rely upon her too much, and that her continued presence will prevent them from reaching their full potential as heroes and as a team.

During the Fear Itself storyline, the team has reverted to the name Great Lakes Avengers where they encounter Asbestos Man, who had been taking advantage of the fear and chaos that is happening. After standing around him for hours, Mr. Immortal talks him into giving up in return for being remembered by the others.

All-New, All Different
It is revealed that the team had disbanded and gone their separate ways. Flatman receives a visit from Connie Ferrari, a lawyer representing the real Avengers, who informs him that the GLA has been reinstated as a permanent addition to the Avengers. Flatman reunites with Big Bertha and Doorman, though Mr. Immortal doesn't show up and Squirrel Girl apparently ignores Flatman's call. The team moves to a new headquarters, a factory owned by Tony Stark in Detroit, Michigan. The team visits a local bar, where a fight breaks out after the owner, Nain Rogue, insults the team. Upon getting arrested after a fight, Doorman escapes, leaving Flatman and Bertha to deal with a young girl named Goodness Silva, who can transform into a werewolf, who was attacking the cops inside the station. Ferrari gets the team released over the accusations of councilman Dick Snerd, who is actually Nain Rouge. She also helps the team recruit Goodness Silva, who takes the name of Good Boy. After Snerd shuts the team down, Mr. Immortal returns and goes on patrol with Flatman, while Bertha, Doorman and Good Boy go to Nain Rogue's bar to find clues. At the bar, Bertha and Good Boy find Snerd drunk and discern his secret identity. Doorman is brought to the Darkforce Dimension where Oblivion angrily questions his absence, while Mr. Immortal and Flatman resolve their issues. Bertha and Good Boy take Nain Rogue hostage, where he reveals some of his background story. While Mr. Immortal, Bertha, and Flatman attend to a visiting Ferrari, Good Boy nearly kills Nain over an insult. After Ferrari tells the team to lie low for a couple of days, Bertha goes to a modeling gig for a weight-loss product created by Dr. Nod — a trap set to get a sample of her mutant DNA and use it to improve his product with Bertha's powers. Meanwhile, Good Boy's brother, Lucky, visits her at GLA HQ and tells her they need to leave town due to what she did to Nain Rogue. Bertha fights back against Dr. Nod and his squad, but Dr. Nod ingests much of the supplements, becoming a huge monster, and injures her. Bertha sends a text to the rest of the team, including Good Boy, and takes some of the supplements herself to fight Dr. Nod. During the battle, Dr. Nod takes more of the supplements, becoming much bigger and monstrous. On Mr. Immortal's suggestion, Doorman and Mr. Immortal enter Dr. Nod's body, where Mr. Immortal kills him by punching his heart. After their victory, the team is visited at their headquarters by Deadpool of the Avengers Unity Division who tells them that they've been fired and can no longer use the Avengers name, since their legal claim did not hold up in court. While he claims that people simply "didn't like them", he does comfort them by proclaiming that they could try to be in the spotlight again in a few years.

Members

Founders

Trainers
Assisted the team by training them, but it is not clear if they joined.

Recruits

False members

Other versions

JLA/Avengers
The GLA appeared in the climax of the JLA/Avengers miniseries, where they assisted in the defeat of Krona.

In other media

Television
 A live action half-hour television sitcom series starring a team based on an amalgamation of the Great Lakes Avengers and the New Warriors, named after the latter, was in development by Marvel Television and ABC Studios as part of the Marvel Cinematic Universe. In July 2017, the New Warriors cast was officially announced to be Milana Vayntrub as Doreen Green / Squirrel Girl, Derek Theler as Craig Hollis / Mister Immortal, Jeremy Tardy as Dwayne Taylor / Night Thrasher, Calum Worthy as Robbie Baldwin / Speedball, Matthew Moy as Zach Smith / Microbe, Kate Comer as Deborah Fields / Debrii, and Keith David as Ernest Vigman. The show received a direct-to-series order with ten episodes to debut on Freeform in 2018, co-produced by ABC Signature, and a pilot episode was produced.  On November 1, 2017, however, it was announced that series would no longer air on Freeform and after an unsuccessful search for other network partners, the series was considered dead.
 Craig Hollis / Mr Immortal would eventually make his live-action debut in She-Hulk: Attorney at Law (2022), portrayed by David Pasquesi.

Albums
 The band Kirby Krackle released a song titled "Great Lakes Avengers" on their album E For Everyone in 2010.

Reception
In August 2009, Time listed the Great Lakes Avengers among the "Top 10 Oddest Marvel Characters".

Collected editions

References

External links
 Great Lakes Avengers
Great Lakes Avengers at Marvel.com

Avengers (comics)
Marvel Comics superhero teams
2005 comics debuts
Characters created by John Byrne (comics)
Fictional characters from Wisconsin